

Administrative and municipal divisions

References

Orenburg Oblast
Orenburg Oblast